Van Tieghem is a surname. Notable people with the surname include:

David Van Tieghem (born 1955), American composer, musician, and sound designer
Philippe Édouard Léon Van Tieghem (1839–1914), French botanist

Surnames of Dutch origin